Kepler-20e is an exoplanet orbiting Kepler-20. The planet is notable as it is the first planet with a smaller radius than Earth found orbiting a Sun-like star. Along with the other four planets in the system, Kepler-20e was announced on 20 December 2011.

Orbit

With a semimajor axis of 0.0507 AUs, Kepler-20e's orbit has a period of 6.098 days (with an extremely small margin of error).  The orbit has an inclination of 87.50°, making its transits observable from the Solar System.  Like the other planets of the system, the planet has a high maximum eccentricity of 0.28, but the lowest in that system.

References

Exoplanets discovered in 2011
E
20e
Transiting exoplanets